Sidetracks: Explorations of a Romantic Biographer is an autobiographical book by the biographer Richard Holmes, his second of three.

References 

 
 
 
 
 
 
 
 

2000 non-fiction books
British autobiographies
English-language books
Pantheon Books books